Alter Ego is a role-playing video game developed and published by Activision in 1986. It was created by Peter J. Favaro for the Commodore 64, DOS, Apple II, and the Apple Macintosh. The game allows the user to make decisions for an imaginary person (being therefore the player's alter ego) and shows what possible consequences these decisions could have on that person. Alter Ego was released in both male and female versions, each using a different set of experiences.

Gameplay

The player's alter ego begins the game as an infant; the game presents the user with a tree diagram with nodes, each labeled with an icon. The player chooses an icon representing an "experience" or situation to explore. Each icon bears a symbol showing what kind of experience it represents (for example, a heart denotes an emotional event). After making a choice in each node, the user is moved back to the tree with that node marked as completed. In this manner, the user progresses through the alter ego's entire life and examines what impact their decisions had. In the process of playing the game, the player's alter ego proceeds through seven phases with their respective experiences: infancy, childhood, adolescence, young adulthood, adulthood, middle adulthood, and old age. Some of these experiences are disturbing, and can even lead to premature death (such as being raped and killed by a child molester), though most tend to be humorous.

Alter Ego keeps track of certain player statistics throughout the game, which in turn affect the alter ego's ability to succeed at certain choices. For example, in the high school segment, the player might be given the choice of trying out for the school baseball team, or deciding instead to crack down and study harder to improve in math. This decision might change the alter ego's "Physical", "Confidence", and "Intellectual" statistics, which in future experiences might influence the alter ego's ability to get into college or succeed in social situations.

Reception
Johnny Wilson of Computer Gaming World described the game as "a delightful, humorous and thought-provoking exercise in decision-making, value exploration and evaluation, and vicarious wish-fulfillment." Minor qualms were raised concerning the disconnect between past experiences and current situations, and the mild tendency of the game to be "preachy". The magazine's Charles Ardai described it as "fascinating the first time out" but repetitive later. Info gave the Commodore 64 version five stars out of five, describing it as "some of the most broadly therapeutic and consciousness-raising software available", and "very entertaining". The reviewer concluded "I would recommend this wholesome software to anyone old enough to read".

The game was also positively reviewed by Zzap!64 magazine.

Reviews
Isaac Asimov's Science Fiction Magazine v10 n10 (1986 10)

References

External links

Images of Alter Ego package, manual and screen for Commodore 64 version
Play the game online
https://www.retrogames.cz/play_727-DOS.php

1986 video games
Activision games
Apple II games
Commodore 64 games
DOS games
Art games
Social simulation video games
Classic Mac OS games
Video games developed in the United States